Di royte fon ('The Red Banner') was a Yiddish-language daily newspaper, published in Vilna between August 1, 1920, and August 24, 1920. It was an organ of the Central Committee of the Communist Party (Bolsheviks) of Lithuania and Belorussia. Moisei Rafes was the editor of Di royte fon.

References

Newspapers established in 1920
Publications disestablished in 1920
Yiddish communist newspapers
Defunct newspapers published in Lithuania
Newspapers published in Vilnius
Jewish Lithuanian history
Jews and Judaism in Vilnius
Yiddish-language mass media in Lithuania
Daily newspapers published in Lithuania
1920 establishments in Lithuania
Secular Jewish culture in Europe